Suma Bhattacharya is a fintech entrepreneur, model, dancer and film actress. Since 2011 she is a Fintech Entrepreneur having co-founded the payments technology company LivQuik technologies in India. And now leads fintech companies in the UK at exec level. She started her career with Credit Suisse in London as an Analyst. Currently she is based out of Mumbai and works as a senior analyst at Samena Capital, a Hong Kong-based hedge fund. She began modeling soon after and was a finalist in the Miss India World competition (2008) and was crowned Miss India UK (2008). She became an actress thereafter.

She is also a Kathak dancer and has performed professionally at various venues in the UK including the Royal Albert Hall.

She first appeared in a Bollywood telefilm Like I Love You, produced by Shahrukh Khan's production house Red Chillies Entertainment, following which she debuted in Telugu with Kudirithe Cup Coffee, directed by Rama Selva, pairing with Varun Sandesh. She then completed working on her debut Tamil film, Muran, featuring alongside director-actor Cheran and Prasanna.

Filmography

References

External links
 

Living people
Actresses from London
British film actresses
British actresses of Indian descent
British people of Bengali descent
Actresses in Hindi cinema
Actresses in Telugu cinema
Actresses in Tamil cinema
British expatriate actresses in India
European actresses in India
English female models
Year of birth missing (living people)
21st-century British actresses
21st-century English actresses